These are '''lists of school districts in the United States

States

Alabama
Alaska
Arizona 
Arkansas
California
Colorado
Connecticut
Delaware
Florida
Georgia
Hawaii
Idaho
Illinois
Indiana
Iowa
Kansas
Kentucky 
Louisiana
Maine 
Maryland
Massachusetts
Michigan 
Minnesota
Mississippi
Missouri
Montana
Nebraska
Nevada 
New Hampshire
New Jersey
New Mexico
New York
North Carolina
North Dakota
Ohio
Oklahoma
Oregon
Pennsylvania
Rhode Island
South Carolina
South Dakota
Tennessee
Texas
Utah
Vermont
Virginia
Washington
West Virginia
Wisconsin
Wyoming

District of Columbia
District of Columbia: District of Columbia Public Schools

Insular areas
American Samoa: American Samoa Department of Education
Guam: Guam Department of Education
Northern Mariana Islands: Commonwealth of the Northern Mariana Islands Public School System
Puerto Rico: Puerto Rico Department of Education
List of school districts in the United States Virgin Islands

Notes

External links